The Red Army is the Strongest, popularly known as "White Army, Black Baron", is a marching song written by composed by Samuil Pokrass (1897–1939) and Pavel Grigorevich Gorinshtejn (1895–1961, a.k.a. Pavel Gorin, Pavel Grigorev). Written in 1920, during the October Revolution, the song was intended as a combat anthem for the Red Army of the Kiev Military District.

History
The immediate context of the song is the final Crimean offensive in the Russian Civil War by  Pyotr Wrangel's troops in July 1920. The second verse refers to the call to a final effort in the Crimea published by the  Revolutionary Military Council in Pravda on 10 July.
While the song has a separate refrain, the verses repeat the claim that "The Red Army is stronger than all", which came to be the song's conventional title.
The first verse of the song reads as follows:

"Black Baron" was a nickname of Wrangel's, from his alleged penchant for wearing (and dressing some of his elite units in) black uniforms. 
Wrangel's offensive was indeed halted by the Red Army, and Wrangel and his troops were forced to retreat to Crimea in November 1920, pursued by both Red and Black cavalry and infantry. Wrangel and the remains of his army were evacuated from Crimea to Constantinople on 14 November 1920.

The song became popular in the early Soviet Union. It was sung in 1923 at the rally in Leningrad against the Curzon Line, the "British seas" acquiring new significance in view of Lord Curzon's ultimatum. In a letter to a school for blind students in the Vologda region, Nadezhda Krupskaya, wife of Vladimir Lenin, named it as her favourite songs alongside The Internationale. The phrase "from the taiga to the British Seas" became something of an idiomatic expression used by other authors, e.g. by V. A. Lugovsky in his poem Песни о ветре ("Song of the Wind", 1926).

In its early oral transmission during 1920–1925, the song underwent some variation.
Gorinshtejn later recalled that his original lyrics had four or five verses, and that his original refrain was slightly different from the received version (reading ).

During the 1920s to 1940s, the song was reproduced without indication of its authors. It was only in the 1950s that musicologist A. Shilov established the authorship of Gorinshtejn and Pokrass.

The Russian song was adopted by the Chapaev Battalion of the International Brigades in the Spanish Civil War, and it was allegedly sung in a Nazi torture chamber by Czech communist Julius Fučík.
Alternative Russian lyrics were set to the tune during World War II, e.g.  (Pyotr Belyi 1941 ).
Even after the disintegration of the Soviet Union, the tune is still played as a march during the military parades on Red Square.

In Red Vienna, the tune was used for the song Die Arbeiter von Wien (The Workers of Vienna) highlighting those fighting for a bright future of the proletariat.

Translations and variations
The tune was also used for communist songs in other languages, including Weimar Germany in the 1920s by German Communists. An early German version with the incipit  ("White riffraff, noble scum") was a free translation of the original lyrics:

A popular variant of the song, "Die Arbeiter von Wien," was written by Fritz Brügel in 1927. It became popular through its use by Austrian socialists (see also Republikanischer Schutzbund) who fought the Dollfuss regime in the short-lived Austrian Civil War in February 1934. The first verse of Brügel's version reads:

The German version was further adapted in Turkish, as Avusturya İşçi Marşı ("Austrian Workers' March"). The first verse of Turkish version reads:

Lyrics

Russian lyrics after Kryukov and Shvedov (1977)

Translations into English

References
General

Specific

A. V. Shilov, Из истории первых советских песен  1917-24 ("On the History of the First Soviet Songs, 1917-24"), Moscow, 1963.
A. Sokhor, Как начиналась советская музыка ("How Soviet Music began"), "МЖ" no. 2, 1967.
N. Kryukov, M. Shvedov, Русские советские песни (1917-1977) ("Russian Soviet Songs 1917-1977),  "Худож. лит.", 1977.
Yu. E. Biryukov, ИСТОРИЯ СОЗДАНИЯ ПЕСНИ «КРАСНАЯ АРМИЯ ВСЕХ СИЛЬНЕЙ» (muzruk.info, 2009)

External links
Draft Translation from Russian to English - word-by-word rough text
MIA: History: Soviet History: Sounds of the Soviet Union: Lyrics: White Army, Black Baron
"Die Arbeiter von Wien / Wir sind das Bauvolk der kommenden Welt." 

Popularity of the title "White Army, Black Baron"

Russian military songs
Soviet songs
Compositions in A minor
Russian military marches
Songs about military officers
Songs about Russia